= Basaloid large cell carcinoma of the lung =

- Other names: Basaloid large cell lung cancer (Bas-LCLC)
- Specialty: Oncology/pulmonology

Basaloid large cell carcinoma of the lung, is a rare histological variant of lung cancer featuring certain distinctive cytological, tissue architectural, and immunohistochemical characteristics and clinical behavior.

== Classification ==
Lung cancer is a large and exceptionally heterogeneous family of malignancies. Over 50 different histological variants are explicitly recognized within the 2004 revision of the World Health Organization (WHO) typing system ("WHO-2004"), currently the most widely used lung cancer classification scheme.

Many recognized lung cancer variants are rare, recently described and poorly understood. However, since different forms of malignant tumors generally exhibit diverse genetic, biological and clinical properties, including response to treatment, accurate classification of lung cancer cases are critical to ensuring that patients with lung cancer receive optimum management.

== Diagnosis ==
Like other forms of lung cancer, Bas-LCLC is ultimately diagnosed after a pathologist examines a tumor sample containing viable malignant cells and tissue under a light microscope and identifies certain particular characteristics.

=== Staging ===
Staging of Bas-LCLC patients is usually performed in an analogous fashion to patients with other non-small cell lung carcinoma.

== Treatment ==
Because of its rarity, there have been no clinical trials conducted on pure Bas-LCLC.

Generally, variants of the 4 major lung cancer subtypes (squamous cell carcinoma, small cell carcinoma, adenocarcinoma, large cell carcinoma) are treated according to protocols designed for the major subtype.

== Prognosis ==
Bas-LCLC are considered to have a particularly poor prognosis, even compared to other forms of lung cancer. However, not all studies have confirmed this.

== Epidemiology ==
Basaloid carcinomas of the lung (like nearly all other recognized subtypes of lung cancer) are highly associated with tobacco smoking. Basaloid architecture in pulmonary carcinomas have been shown to be particularly prevalent in smokers with heavy exposure,

== History ==
Basaloid forms of lung carcinoma were first described in the peer-reviewed medical literature by Dr. Elisabeth Brambilla and her colleagues in 1992. They were first recognized as distinct clinicopathological variants of both squamous cell and large cell lung cancers in 1999, within the third revision of the World Health Organization lung tumor typing and classification scheme.
